In solid geometry, a wedge is a polyhedron defined by two triangles and three trapezoid faces. A wedge has five faces, nine edges, and six vertices. 

A wedge is a subclass of the prismatoids with the base and opposite ridge in two parallel planes.

A wedge can also be classified as a digonal cupola.

Comparisons:
 A wedge is a parallelepiped where a face has collapsed into a line.
 A quadrilaterally-based pyramid is a wedge in which one of the edges between two trapezoid faces has collapsed into a point.

Volume
For a rectangle based wedge, the volume is 
 
where the base rectangle is a by b, c is the apex edge length parallel to a, and h the height from the base rectangle to the apex edge.

Examples

Wedges can be created from decomposition of other polyhedra. For instance, the dodecahedron can be divided into a central cube with 6 wedges covering the cube faces. The orientations of the wedges are such that the triangle and trapezoid faces can connect and form a regular pentagon.

A triangular prism is a special case wedge with the two triangle faces being translationally congruent.

Two obtuse wedges can be formed by bisecting a regular tetrahedron on a plane parallel to two opposite edges.

References
 Harris, J. W., & Stocker, H. "Wedge". §4.5.2 in Handbook of Mathematics and Computational Science. New York: Springer, p. 102, 1998.

External links
 

Polyhedra
Prismatoid polyhedra